Yuri Kharlampiyevich Kotov (born 23 February 1929) is a Russian professional football coach and a former player.

External links
 

1929 births
Living people
Soviet footballers
FC Dynamo Stavropol players
Soviet football managers
Russian football managers
PFC Spartak Nalchik managers
FC Elista managers
FC Dynamo Stavropol managers
Association footballers not categorized by position
People from Pyatigorsk
Sportspeople from Stavropol Krai